Joy Levitt is an American rabbi and from 1987 to 1989 was the first female president of the Reconstructionist Rabbinical Association. Levitt is also the founder of the Jewish Journey Project, an initiative that attempts to replace individual synagogue schools (in Manhattan) with an elective-driven communal coalition. She and her husband Rabbi Michael Strassfeld are coeditors of the A Night of Questions Passover Haggadah, published by the Reconstructionist Press. She is currently the Marlene Meyerson Jewish Community Center in Manhattan's Chief Executive Officer, a position she will hold through December 2021. In addition to the Jewish Journey Project, Levitt has presided over some of the JCC's biggest accomplishments, including the founding of the Adaptations program, the Literacy and Math Tutoring Program, Saturday Morning Community Partners, the Other Israel and ReelAbilities Film Festivals, and oversaw the creation of the JCC's ten centers of excellence; she also spearheaded advocacy efforts like the New York response to the Save Darfur Coalition rally in 2006.

In 2008 the PBS series "The Jewish Americans" had her as a featured commentator.
In 2010 she was named one of fifty of the most influential rabbis in America by The Sisterhood, The Jewish Daily Forward's women's issues blog. She was also named by Newsweek (in 2010 and 2011) as one of the most influential rabbis in America.

In 1975 she earned a bachelor's degree from Barnard College, followed by a master's degree from New York University in 1976 and a rabbinical degree from the Reconstructionist Rabbinical College in 1981.

See also
Timeline of women rabbis

References 

American Reconstructionist rabbis
Reconstructionist women rabbis
Year of birth missing (living people)
Living people
Barnard College alumni
New York University alumni
Reconstructionist Rabbinical College alumni
21st-century American Jews